Johnny Anker Lunde (26 October 1923 – 2 April 2013) was a Norwegian alpine skier and engineer.

He was born in Nore, and represented the club Konnerud IL. He participated at the 1948 Winter Olympics in  Saint Moritz, and at the 1952 Winter Olympics in Oslo. He did not finish the downhill race in 1948, but finished a tied 20th in downhill in 1952. In 1949 he won the downhill competition which was part of the alpine combined in the Norwegian championship.

He graduated as a construction engineer from ETH Zurich in 1949. After working in construction from 1950 to 1958 he spent his career in the Norwegian Geotechnical Institute until 1990, working with geomechanics.

He resided in Sandvika. He was a grandfather of snowboarder Line Østvold. He died in April 2013.

References

External links

1923 births
2013 deaths
People from Buskerud
People from Nore og Uvdal 
Sportspeople from Bærum
Norwegian male alpine skiers
Olympic alpine skiers of Norway
Alpine skiers at the 1948 Winter Olympics
Alpine skiers at the 1952 Winter Olympics
Norwegian expatriates in Switzerland
ETH Zurich alumni
Norwegian engineers